The Klameliidae is a family of extinct mammals from the Jurassic, belonging to the gobiconodonts. It contains only two species: Ferganodon narynensis and Klamelia zhaopengi.

References

Middle Jurassic first appearances
Middle Jurassic extinctions
Prehistoric mammal families
Taxa named by Thomas Martin (paleontologist)
Taxa named by Alexander O. Averianov